Grand Tour is the twelfth studio album by the English progressive rock band Big Big Train. It contains all new songs unlike the previous, The Second Brightest Star. Thematically it broadens the lyrical landscape for the group into the European world, previously having a largely domestic British focus. It moves from English folklore and landscape, to the 17th and 18th century habit of well-to-do Europeans going on the 'Grand Tour' to experience a wider circle of art and science. It is the last studio album to feature band members Dave Gregory, Rachel Hall, and Danny Manners who left in 2020.

Reception

Initially well received, The Times says of this release, "A prog rock album that doesn't yield its secrets straight away and repays repeated listening". Tony Colvill in his review had been critical of the last two releases but then writes of this offering, "it's something new, a little bit different, but to the same high standards," presumably harking back to the 'railway inspired' subject content of English Electric: Full Power. He continues to heap praise on this offering with repeated and positive comparisons with Genesis both vocally and instrumentally. Daily Express writer Paul Davies also make comparisons to Genesis and adds a reference to Queen. Noting the subject of the Renaissance when referring to progressive music in general, he clearly underlines the band's significance. He assigns a rating of 5 out of 5.

Track listing

Personnel
Big Big Train
 Nick D'Virgilio – drums, percussion, backing vocals, co-lead vocals on "Theodora in Green and Gold", additional keyboards, guitars
 Dave Gregory – 6-string and 12-string guitars
 Rachel Hall – violin, backing vocals
 David Longdon – lead vocals, flute, additional keyboards, guitars
 Danny Manners – keyboards
 Rikard Sjöblom – 6-string and 12-string guitars, keyboards on "Theodora in Green and Gold", backing vocals
 Greg Spawton – bass guitar, bass pedals, additional 12-string guitars

Production
 Rob Aubrey – mixing, mastering
 Rachel Hall – string arrangements on Voyager (with Manners & Spawton)
 Dave Desmond – brass arrangements (with Spawton)

Charts

References

Big Big Train albums
2019 albums